Faisal Town (Punjabi, Sharak-e-Faisal) is a union council and neighborhood of Gulberg Tehsil in Lahore, in Punjab, Pakistan.

Subdivisions
Faisal Town is divided into four residential blocks - A, B, C and D.

Government
Faisal Town is the union council number 128 of Lahore and falls in the town called Gulberg Town. There is no town Nazim of Gulberg Town and the seat is vacant. The current union council administration heads of Faisal Town are:
 Nazim: Vacant
 Naib Nazim: Vacant

Markets
The biggest market is located in C Block and is commonly called Civic Centre. There is a smaller market in B Block called Kotha Pind market. The roads around Faisal Town are becoming increasingly commercial, especially the road between Faisal Town and Johar Town. There are two famous wholesale and retail stores near to the FAST institute (in B Block) named as Ali General Store and Hassan Store. Maqsood  Store and Chishti Super Store are  the popular stores in D Block.

Mosques
A Block has a mosque called Abu Bakar Mosque. B Block has two mosques: one is called Be-izn-Allah Mosque and the other is the Kotha Pind Mosque. C Block houses two mosques as well.

Educational institutions
 St Anthony's High School
 National University of Computer and Emerging Sciences (B Block)
 Government Girls School (B Block)
 Cathedral School (D Block)
 Lahore Grammar School (373-C, Faisal Town, Lahore)

Medical facilities
There is a private hospital in A Block.
In C Block there is another Trust Hospital named Khair-un-Nisa Hospital. Renowned physician Faisal Masud also lived in C block, Faisal Town where he had his clinic.

Parks
A Block has a large park with associated small parks. B Block also has a big park called Milad Park. C Block has two parks next to the two mosques. D block also has a park.

See also
 Lahore

References

External links
Union Council Faisal Town government website

Gulberg, Lahore
Karachi Central District